Laüs or Laus was an ancient city of Magna Graecia on the coast of the Tyrrhenian Sea. It was a colony of Sybaris at the mouth of the Lao River, which formed the boundary between Lucania and Bruttium in ancient times. The river and the city have the same name in Ancient Greek. Today the archaeological site of the city can be found at a short distance to the east of Marcellina, a frazione of the comune of Santa Maria del Cedro in Calabria.

History
Little is known about its foundation or history. Herodotus states that the inhabitants of Sybaris who had survived the destruction of their city in 510 BCE took refuge in Laüs and Scidrus. Diodorus Siculus seems to imply that that city had been captured by the Lucanians before or during 390 BCE. He writes that the army of Thurii had repelled a force of the Lucanians which had attacked their territory in 390 BCE. The Lucanians then withdrew to their own territory and Thurians pursued them to lay siege to the "prosperous" town of Laüs. On the way to Laüs the Thurians were ambushed and crushed by the Lucanians.

Pseudo-Scylax writes that it was a colony of Thurii.

Strabo describes the city as still being in existence in his time. He mentions a heroon to Draco, a companion of Odysseus, stood there. The first edition of Strabo's Geographica was published in 7 BCE and the last no later than 23 CE. Pliny the Elder, whose Natural History was published in approximately 77–79 CE, states that the city no longer existed in his time.

The site near Marcellina which is now identified as Laüs was possibly a refoundation of the Greek city by Lucanians on a previously unoccupied site. The city was downsized gradually and abandoned in the second half of the third century BCE. This was probably caused by the Punic Wars, which had a profound impact on the economy of the Tyrrhenian coast. The only material evidence of the Archaic Greek city consists of some silver coins with the legend LAFINON and symbols similar to those of the coins of Sybaris, dated between 500 and 440 BCE.

Excavations
The first excavation started between 1929 and 1932. The necropolis of Laüs now lies below Marcellina and is notable for its important finds. A rich tomb chamber was discovered by accident in 1961 not far from the railway station of Marcellina. Dozens of red-figured vases, bronze and precious metals, and a finely crafted bronze armor were found in the tomb. The burial dated to the second half of the fourth century BCE and is now exhibited in the Museo Nazionale della Magna Grecia in Reggio Calabria. Other burials of the same period, though less rich, were found in the same area in the 1950s and 1960s.

The excavations revealed a city that was defended on at least three sides by a wall. The urban space was organized according to a grid plan with at least two central roadways in a north–south orientation and 12 meters wide. These were intersected at regular distances of 96 meters by perpendicular roads in an east–west orientation and approximately 5 meters wide. This created a checkerboard layout of building blocks containing four dwellings, which were further separated by narrow lanes. In the south-east of the site, near the present cemetery, an area characterized by the presence of artisanal kilns for the production of ceramics was discovered.

The site today
The Laüs Archaeological Park was created in 1994 to protect the archaeological site and covers an area of approximately 60 hectares. Some ancient structures were restored and a small museum, the Antiqarium, was set up in a building nearby. By 16 January 2013 the site was closed.

See also
List of ancient Greek cities

References

External links
Official website of the Laüs Archaeological Park (Italian)

Achaean colonies of Magna Graecia
Ruins in Italy
Lucania
Former populated places in Italy
Archaeological sites in Calabria